Luc Argand (born 7 January 1948) is a Swiss lawyer, and a partner at the Kellerhals Carrard law firm since 2019. Prior to that, he was a senior partner at the De Pfyffer law firm in Geneva. He is a former Chairman of the Geneva Bar Association. 

Luc Argand competed in the 1972 Olympics in Munich in the sailing Flying Dutchman category[4]. He has been a judge for the Court of Arbitration for Sport since 1990, and notably presided over the trials of tennis player Richard Gasquet and cyclist Richard Virenque. He was a legal advisor to Bernie Ecclestone, and a trustee of Formula One Holdings until 2004. He was also the President of the Geneva Motor Show from 2005 until 2011.

References

External links
 

1948 births
Living people
Swiss male sailors (sport)
Olympic sailors of Switzerland
Sailors at the 1972 Summer Olympics – Flying Dutchman